The 1996 United States Senate special election in Kansas was held November 5, 1996, concurrently with the presidential election and the regularly scheduled election for the state's Class 2 seat. Incumbent Republican U.S. Senator and Senate Majority Leader Bob Dole, the Republican nominee for president, had resigned on June 11, 1996, in order to focus on his presidential campaign. Lieutenant Governor Sheila Frahm was appointed to the seat upon Dole's resignation, but she was defeated in the primary by Representative Sam Brownback, who went on to win the general election.

In the 2014 Kansas gubernatorial election, Docking ran for Lieutenant Governor on the Democratic ticket attempting to oust Brownback, who ultimately prevailed by a margin of 3.7%.

Republican primary

Candidates
 Sam Brownback, U.S. Congressman and former Kansas Secretary of Agriculture
 Sheila Frahm, incumbent U.S. Senator and former Lieutenant Governor of Kansas
 Christina Campbell-Cline, accountant

Results

Democratic primary

Candidates
 Jill Docking, businesswoman and daughter-in-law of former Kansas Governor Robert Docking
 Joan Finney, former Governor of Kansas and former Kansas State Treasurer

Results

General election

Candidates
 Sam Brownback (R), U.S. Congressman and former Kansas Secretary of Agriculture
 Jill Docking (D), businesswoman and daughter-in-law of former Kansas Governor Robert Docking
 Donald Klaassen (Reform), businessman

Results

Aftermath 
Brownback was elected to a full term in 1998, and was re-elected to a second full term in 2004. In 2010, Brownback was elected governor, and won a second term in 2014. He resigned as governor on January 31, 2018, to accept an ambassadorship and was succeeded by Lieutenant Governor Jeff Colyer.

Brownback's seat is now held by Jerry Moran, a U.S. Representative from Kansas' 1st district for seven terms (1997-2011).

Docking was the running mate of the Democratic nominee, state representative and Minority Leader Paul Davis, in the 2014 election.

See also 
 1996 United States Senate elections

References 

United States Senate Special
Kansas
1996
Kansas 1996
Kansas 1996
United States Senate 1996